Maxwell Struthers Burt (October 18, 1882 Baltimore, Maryland – August 29, 1954, Jackson Hole, Wyoming), was an American novelist, poet, and short-story writer.

Life
Struthers Burt grew up in Philadelphia, where he attended private schools and worked at a city newspaper. He graduated from Princeton University in 1904, then attended the University of Munich, and Merton College at Oxford University. Following his return to the United States, he taught English at Princeton.

In 1908, he moved to Wyoming and co-founded the JY Ranch with Louis Joy, which would later become the famous Rockefeller ranch of the same name. In 1912, following a dispute with Joy, he established his own dude ranch, the Bar B C Ranch. That same year, he met and married his wife, Katharine Newlin Burt, an author of Western novels. They had two children: Nathaniel Burt (1913-2003) and Julia Bleecker Burt Atteberry (1915-1986).

Burt served in the U.S. Army Air Service Signal Corps during World War I. After the war, he and his family began wintering in North Carolina.

Burt helped in the establishment of Grand Teton National Park when, in 1923, he met with other like-minded individuals at Maud Noble's cabin and began the process of gathering support to have the area come under protection by the Federal Government. He was also a fierce supporter of the Jackson Hole National Monument before it eventually formed the larger Grand Teton National Park.

The premise of Burt's fifth novel, Along these Streets, is a Westerner who inherits a large Philadelphia fortune, with the stipulation that he must move East and live in the city. Felix Bartain Macalister experiences the city's cultural traditions, and encounters various characters who attempt to guide or exploit him. Compared with contemporaneous novels, sociologist E. Digby Baltzell found it "… a far more sensitive portrait of Proper Philadelphia." This portrait, however, is painted in opposition to Proper Philadelphia's conservatism, which the main character readily acknowledges: "… I think I'm what might be called a radical liberal, but I'm for evolution, not revolution." At the end of the novel, Felix escapes and finds himself on horseback in … Wyoming.
 
Burt's papers are housed at Princeton University and the University of Wyoming's American Heritage Center.

His son Nathaniel was also a published author, as is his grandson, Christopher C. Burt (b. 1954). Nathaniel Burt wrote of his late father's novels: "There is always a love story, there is always a certain strict plotting of acceptance, withdrawal, misunderstanding, and final clinch that leads to much amusing discussion of the difference between men and women, but which does not escape a sort of artificiality."

Bibliography

Poetry collections
In The High Hills (Houghton Mifflin, Boston, 1914)
Songs and Portraits (1920)
When I Grew Up to Middle Age (Charles Scribner's Sons, New York, 1925)
War Songs (Charles Scribner's Sons, New York, 1942)

Plays
The Mullah of Miasmia (1903)

Novels
The Interpreter’s House (Charles Scribner's Sons, New York, 1924)
The Delectable Mountains (Charles Scribner's Sons, New York, 1927)
Festival (Charles Scribner's Sons, New York, 1931)
Entertaining the Islanders (Charles Scribner's Sons, New York, 1933)
Along These Streets (Charles Scribner's Sons, New York, 1942)

Short story collections
John O'May and Other Stories (1918)
Chance Encounters (1921)
They Could Not Sleep (1928)

Non fiction
The Diary of a Dude Wrangler (Charles Scribner's Sons, New York, 1924)
The Other Side''' (Charles Scribner's Sons, New York, 1928)Malice in Blunderland (1935)Escape from America (Charles Scribner's Sons, New York, 1936)Powder River: Let 'er Buck (Farrar & Rinehart, New York,1938) part of the Rivers of America SeriesPatriotism Versus Prejudice: Hitler Forces at Work in America (American Jewish Committee, 1939)Philadelphia Holy Experiment (Doubleday, Doran, & Co., New York, 1945)The History of Cap and Gown: 1890-1950 (Princeton University Press, 1951)

Magazine articles
(See also pseudonym "Burt Struthers")The Diary of a Dude Wrangler, The Saturday Evening Post May 3, 1924Beauty and the Blantons, McCall’s June, 1925Acorns,  The Saturday Evening Post Jan 9, 1926Adventure,  The Saturday Evening Post Jun 30, 1928Artists,  The Saturday Evening Post Jun 1, 1929C’est La Guerre, The Saturday Evening Post Feb 5, 1927Democracy for Everyone'',  The Saturday Evening Post Jul 30, 1932

Notes

References
 American Book Exchange
 Papers and Biography in Princeton Library

External links

 
 
 
Burt Family Papers at the University of Wyoming - American Heritage Center

20th-century American novelists
20th-century American poets
People from Baltimore
Writers from Wyoming
Princeton University alumni
Writers from Philadelphia
1882 births
1954 deaths
People from Jackson Hole, Wyoming
American male novelists
American male poets
American male short story writers
O. Henry Award winners
20th-century American short story writers
20th-century American male writers
Novelists from Pennsylvania
Writers from North Carolina
Members of the American Academy of Arts and Letters